Franz "Bimbo" Binder (1 December 1911 – 24 April 1989) was an Austrian football player and coach who played as a forward. Internationally he represented the Austria national football team and the Germany national football team during the Anschluss.

Club career
Binder came from a family of labourers. He had nine siblings. When he was 15 years old he played football for the first team of Sturm 19 St. Pölten. Nicknamed Bimbo, Binder was a prolific goalscorer who played for SK Rapid Wien. He won the national Austrian championship four times and was three times top goalscorer in the Austrian league. In 1941 he also won the German championship with a 4–3 victory against Schalke 04, where he scored three goals. From 1930 to 1937, Binder scored more than 700 goals For Rapid Vienna, including the reserves;
1930 - First team - 3 goals in 2 games. Reserve team - 14 goals in 9 games. Total - 17 games 11 goals.
1931 - First team - 19 goals in 14 games. Reserve team 54 goals in 23 games. Total - 73 goals 37 games.
1932 - First team - 62 goals in 48 games. Reserve team - 41 goals in 12 games. Total - 103 goals in 60 games.
1933 - First team - 104 goals in 68 games.
1934 - First team - 93 goals in 56 games.
1935 First team - 95 goals in 58 games.
1936 - First team - 93 goals in 61 games.
1937 - First team - 122 goals in 72 games.
Total Reserve - 109 goals in 44 games.
Total First team - 591 goals in 378 games.
Total Rapid Vienna, 1930-1937 - 700 goals in 422 games with a ratio of 1.65 goals per game.

He is the all time leading scorer of Rapid Vienna with 1006 goals in 757 games and regarded as one of the greatest Austrian players of all times. In his whole career he would score 1202 goals in 831 matches. With an average-score of 1.44 goals per match, he is among the most prolific scorers in football history. Binder is one of only a few players to score more than 1200 goals in his professional career alongside Lajos Tichy, Josef Bican, Gerd Müller, Ferenc Puskás, Ferenc Deák, Erwin Helmchen and Pelé.

Career statistics

International career
Binder was a very prolific goal scorer for both club and country, scoring 16 goals in 19 international matches for Austria, and later 10 goals in just 9 matches for Germany. He made his international debut on 11 June 1933 in a friendly against Belgium, scoring twice in a 4-1 win. In 1934, he scored a goal against both Italy and Czechoslovakia, the 1934 World Cup champions and runner-ups respectively. In January 1936, he scored a goal against both Iberian teams, Spain and Portugal, in 5-4 and 3-2 wins respectively. In 1937, he scored winners against France and Latvia (both 2-1 victories), with the latter being the most important as it assured Austria a ticket to the 1938 World Cup.

His debut with Germany was remarkably similar to Austria's, as he scored against Belgium in a 4-1 win again. He then scored two back-to-back hat-tricks against Bohemia and Moravia and the then World Champions Italy, with the former salvaging his side a 4-4 draw while the latter helped to a 5-2 win. In the following year he scored two more goals against Italy in a 3-2 win at the San Siro, which were the last he scored for Germany. After an 8-year hiatus, he returned to an Austria line-up in 1945, and despite being in his late 30s he still managed to score a further 5 goals for Austria before retiring from international football.

International goals

Goals for Austria
Austria score listed first, score column indicates score after each Austria goal.

Goals for Germany
Germany score listed first, score column indicates score after each Binder goal.

Managerial career
After retirement from playing he became a football coach, of teams such as SSV Jahn Regensburg, PSV Eindhoven, 1. FC Nürnberg, TSV 1860 Munich and Rapid Wien.

Player honours

Club
Rapid Wien
 Austrian Football Bundesliga: 1934–35, 1937–38, 1945–46, 1947–48
 Great Germany Gauliga: 1940, 1941
 Wiener Cup: 1945–46
 DFB-Pokal: 1938

Individual
Austrian Bundesliga top goalscorer: 1933, 1937, 1938
Gauliga Top Goalscorer: 1939, 1940, 1941

See also 
 List of men's footballers with 500 or more goals

References

External links
 Franz Binder at Rapidarchiv 
 
 

1911 births
1989 deaths
People from Sankt Pölten
Austrian footballers
Austria international footballers
German footballers
Germany international footballers
Dual internationalists (football)
SK Rapid Wien players
Austrian Football Bundesliga players
Austrian football managers
SK Rapid Wien managers
TSV 1860 Munich managers
1. FC Nürnberg managers
Bundesliga managers
Association football forwards
Austrian expatriate football managers
Expatriate football managers in Germany
Austrian expatriate sportspeople in Germany
Expatriate football managers in the Netherlands
Austrian expatriate sportspeople in the Netherlands
Footballers from Lower Austria